"Hot Dog Buddy Buddy" is a 1956 rock and roll song composed by Bill Haley and released as a Decca single and also on Brunswick. The song appeared in the 1956 Columbia Pictures movie Don't Knock the Rock.

Background

"Hot Dog Buddy Buddy" was written by Bill Haley and published by Valley Brook Publications, Inc., Chester, Pennsylvania and by Chappell and Company, Ltd., in the UK.

The song was recorded at the Pythian Temple studios in New York City on March 30, 1956. 
 
The song was released as a Decca 45 single on June 4, 1956 as 9-29948, backed with "Rockin' Through the Rye". The single reached number 36 on the Cash Box pop singles chart and number 60 on Billboard. The song was also released as a 45 single in Australia on Festival Records as SP45-1034, in Belgium, on Omega as 61.060 as a 78, in South Africa, on Decca as FM1415, and in Japan, as a blue label Decca 45, D45-474.

The Comets performed "Hot Dog Buddy Buddy" in the 1956 film Don't Knock the Rock. The song was also performed on the NBC TV show Atlantic City Holiday in 1956.

The song was performed live for an Alan Freed show in 1956.

The song also appeared in the 1958 German film, Hier Bin Ich, Heir Bleib Ich, or Here I Am --- Here I'll Stay in English, starring Caterina Valente.

The recording was also released as a 78 single in the UK on Brunswick Records as 05582.

The song appeared on the 1956 Decca Records LP, Rock 'n' Roll Stage Show.

The recording was on the 1985 MCA compilation album, From the Original Master Tapes.

Personnel (original 1956 recording)
Rudy Pompilli - tenor saxophone
Bill Haley – rhythm guitar
Franny Beecher – lead guitar
Billy Williamson – steel guitar
Johnny Grande – piano
Al Rex – bass
Ralph Jones – drums

Other versions
The song has been recorded or performed by The Belew Twins, Adriano Celentano, Phil Haley and His Comments, The Fireballs, Gina Haley live on the 2011 tour, The Speedos, Eddie Martin and the Rhythm Cruisers, Pete Anderson & The Archives, and Bernie Woods and the Forest Fires on the album, Rock, Roll & Stroll.

Ian Dury quoted from the song in his own recording "Bill Haley's Last Words" from the 1992 album, The Bus Driver's Prayer & Other Stories.

References

Sources
Dawson, Jim. Rock Around the Clock : The Record that Started the Rock Revolution (Backbeat Books, 2005. 
John W. Haley and John von Hoëlle, Sound and Glory (Wilmington, DE: Dyne-American, 1990)
John Swenson, Bill Haley (London: W.H. Allen, 1982)

1956 songs
Bill Haley songs
Songs written by Bill Haley
Decca Records singles
Festival Records singles